Boione was a town of ancient Aeolis. Its name does not appear in history, but is deduced from numismatic evidence consisting of coins dated to the 4th and 3rd centuries BCE on which the inscriptions «ΒΟΙΩΝΙΤΙΚΟΝ» or «ΒΟΙΩΝΙΤΙΚΟΣ» appear.

The majority of the coins of Boione have been recovered in the valley of the Hermus River; however, its site is unlocated. The editors of the Barrington Atlas of the Greek and Roman World suggest it may be found between Larissa and Phocaea.

References

Populated places in ancient Aeolis
Former populated places in Turkey
Lost ancient cities and towns